Adams Square may refer to:

 Adams Square (BERy station), Boston, Massachusetts
 Adams Square (Boston), Boston, Massachusetts
 Adams Square, Glendale, California